The 2018 South China Sea Parade was a military parade held in the South China Sea near Sanya, Hainan on April 13, 2018. It is the biggest marine parade since the establishment of the Communist State in 1949 and according to the Chinese government, the biggest in 600 years. It saw 50 warships, 76 fighters and more than 10,000 military officers and soldiers taking part. Xi Jinping, Chairman of the Central Military Commission, reviewed the People's Liberation Army Navy on April 11, 2018. More than half of the vessels were commissioned after the 18th National Congress of the Chinese Communist Party in November 2012, when Xi became the General Secretary of the Chinese Communist Party (paramount leader).

Parade Participants

The First Echelon
 Two Type 094 submarines
 Four Type 093 submarines

The Second Echelon
 Six Type 039 submarines

The Third Echelon
 Four Type 052D destroyers: Hefei (DDG-174), Yinchuan (DDG-175 ), Changsha (DDG-173) and Kunming (DDG-172).
 Two Type 052C destroyers: Changchun (150 ) and Zhengzhou (151)
 Two Type 054A frigates: Hengshui (572) and Liuzhou (573)

The Fourth Echelon
 Chinese aircraft carrier Liaoning
 Type 901 fast combat support ship: Hulunhu (965)
 Type 052D destroyer: Xining (DDG-117 )
 Two Type 052C destroyers: Lanzhou (170) and Haikou (717)
 Type 051C destroyers: Shijiazhuang (116)

The Fifth Echelon
 Two Type 071 amphibious transport docks: Kunlun Shan (998) and Changbai Shan (989)
 Two Type 072A landing ships: Wutai Shan (917) and Wuyi Shan (914)
 Type 052C destroyer: Jinan (152)
 Type 054A frigate: Hengyang (568)

The Sixth Echelon
 Eight Type 056 corvettes: Xinyang (501), Huangshi (502), Qinhuangdao (505), Jingmen (506), Tongren (507), Qujing (508), Hanzhong (520).

The Seventh Echelon
 Type 903 replenishment ship: Luomahu (964).
 Type 815G spy ship: Tianwangxing (853) Type 920 hospital ship: Daishandao (866) Type 910 Auxiliary ship: Zu Chongzhi (893) Type 0891A training ship: Qi Jiguang (83) Type 636A hydrographic survey ship: Deng Jiaxian (874).
 Type 926 submarine support ship: Oceanic Island (864).
 Tugboat: 739''

Gallery

References

2018 in China
Military parades in China
South China Sea Parade
Military history of the People's Republic of China